Freak Out! was a Peruvian magazine, mostly oriented towards the music scene. The first issue dated 2004 and the final 16th issue dated April 2009. The magazine was distributed in the cities of Lima, Arequipa, Cuzco and Trujillo.

References

External links

2004 establishments in Peru
2006 disestablishments in Peru
Defunct magazines published in Peru
Magazines established in 2004
Magazines disestablished in 2006
Magazines published in Peru
Spanish-language magazines